William Maxwell Henderson (November 4, 1901 – October 6, 1966) was a professional baseball pitcher. "Wild Bill" played part of one season in Major League Baseball for the New York Yankees in 1930. In 3 career games, he had a 0–0 record, with a 4.50 ERA. He batted and threw right-handed.

Henderson's minor league baseball career spanned fifteen seasons, from 1923 until 1937.

External links

Major League Baseball pitchers
New York Yankees players
Baltimore Orioles (IL) players
Rochester Red Wings players
Jersey City Skeeters players
Oakland Oaks (baseball) players
San Francisco Seals (baseball) players
Seattle Indians players
Portland Beavers players
Knoxville Smokies players
Augusta Tigers players
Baseball players from Florida
1901 births
1966 deaths
People from Blountstown, Florida